Page-Vawter House in the town of Ansted in Fayette County, West Virginia was built in 1889-90 by company carpenters of the Gauley Mountain Coal Company for the family of William Nelson Page, who was company president. The palatial Victorian mansion is located on a knoll in the middle of town. William and Emma (née Gilham) Page raised their four children there, attended by a staff of 8 servants.

Architect William Minter designed the house in a Gothic style. It has 15 regular rooms, plus a butler's pantry and a dressing room. There are 11 fireplaces with hand-carved wooden mantels; most are in different styles. Even the doors have ornately decorated hinges. The exterior features 52 8-foot-tall windows
 
According to author and railroad historian H. Reid in his book The Virginian Railway (Kalmbach, 1961), it was in this mansion that Page developed the plans for the coal-hauling Virginian Railway, which was financed by industrialist Henry Huddleston Rogers and became the "Richest Little Railroad in the World" after its completion in 1909. The nearby  railroad town of Page was named for him.

The mansion was later occupied by several generations of the Vawter family. In the 21st century, it still stands as evidence of the once-thriving coal business. It underwent a ground up restoration in 2007 by Jim and Debbie Campbell who are the current owners.

The Page-Vawter House was listed on the National Register of Historic Places in 1985.

See also
Hawk's Nest
Midland Trail

References

External links

Special Collection William Nelson Page Papers, Duke University NOTE: this Gift of Mary Josephine Page in 1952 may have been moved to UNC-Chapel Hill  
Special Collection William Nelson Page Papers, Library of the University of North Carolina at Chapel Hill
US Dept. of the Navy, Naval Historical Center
New River CVB Guide to Ansted, WV
Hawk's Nest State Park
Biographical item on William Jordan, an African-American photographer that includes the Gauley Mountain Coal Company startup time frame and information on Ansted WV circa 1889-1909
Article published May 12, 2008 in the State-Journal about the new owners

Houses in Fayette County, West Virginia
Houses on the National Register of Historic Places in West Virginia
Page family of Virginia
Gothic Revival architecture in West Virginia
Victorian architecture in West Virginia
Houses completed in 1890
National Register of Historic Places in Fayette County, West Virginia